The 2000 Asian Women's Handball Championship, the eighth Asian Championship, which was taking place from 10 to 17 August 10 2000 in Shanghai, China. It acted as the Asian qualifying tournament for the 2001 World Women's Handball Championship.

Teams

Preliminary round
All times are local (UTC+8).

Group A

Group B

Placement 5th/6th

Final round

Semifinals

Bronze medal match

Gold medal match

Final standing

External links
Results
www.handball.jp

Asian
H
H
Asian Handball Championships
August 2000 sports events in Asia